Pleuroncodes planipes, sometimes called the pelagic red crab (or simply "red crab"), tuna crab or , is a species of squat lobster from the eastern Pacific Ocean.

Description
It resembles a true lobster, but has a shorter abdomen.

Taxonomic history
Pleuroncodes planipes was first described by William Stimpson in 1860. In his description, Stimpson noted that P. planipes was very close to P. monodon, the only other species in the genus.

Distribution
Pleuroncodes planipes lives on the continental shelf west of Mexico. It is usually found only south-west of San Diego, but in warmer years, its range may extend northwards into California. This is usually indicative of an El Niño event. Adults migrate vertically to near the ocean surface and large numbers occasionally wash up on beaches during warm water events. The southern limit of the species' range is in Chile.

Life cycle
The life cycle of Pleuroncodes planipes appeared for a long time to form a paradox: while an adult population was maintained along the south-western coast of the United States, the planktonic larvae they released were immediately swept by the California Current thousands of miles out to sea. A solution was proposed whereby the larvae use an opposing undercurrent at a lower depth to return to the continental shelf, and this hypothesis was confirmed by sampling different depths of water with a plankton recorder.

Ecology
Pleuroncodes planipes usually feeds on protists and zooplankton, but will feed by filtering blooms of diatoms.

As the most abundant species of micronekton in the California Current, Pleuroncodes planipes fills an important ecological niche converting primary production into energy that larger organisms can use. P. planipes is accordingly an important food item for many species of birds, marine mammals and fish. It is favoured by tuna, leading to one of the species' common names – "tuna crab". Other fish known to feed on P. planipes include billfishes, yellowtail amberjack, sharks and Epinephelus analogus. The diets of gray whales, Bryde's whales, blue whales and sea otters all include P. planipes. The Mexican endemic bat Myotis vivesi also feeds on P. planipes at some times of the year. Off Baja California, the stomachs of some loggerhead sea turtles have been observed to contain only P. planipes. Since P. planipes may be washed ashore in large numbers, it can be a valuable addition to the diets of seabirds such as the herring gull (Larus argentuatus), whose food supply is usually diminished in El Niño years.

References

Squat lobsters
Crustaceans of the eastern Pacific Ocean
Crustaceans described in 1860
Taxa named by William Stimpson